The Tercio "Alejandro Farnesio" No. 4 of the Legion is a regiment of the Spanish Legion. Its sole battalion is the Motorized Infantry Bandera "Millán Astray X. It was founded in 1950 and is currently based in Ronda.

Commanders 
 Colonel Enrique Gomariz de Robles (1 July 1996 - 1 December 2002)
 Colonel Luis Gómez Hortiguela Amillo (1 December 1998 - 17 December 2000)
 Colonel Vicente Díaz de Villegas Herrerías (17 December 2002 - 20 December 2000)
 Colonel José Manuel Muñoz Muñoz (20 December 2000 - 20 December 2002)
 Colonel Juan Bautista García Sánchez (20 December 2002 - 1 November 2004)
 Colonel Ángel Álvarez Jiménez (1 November 2004 - 18 December 2006)
 Colonel Ramón Prieto Oses (18 December 2006 - 20 December 2008)
 Colonel Miguel Martín Bernardi (20 December 2008 - Present)

References

Regiments of the Spanish Legion